Rachel Claire Levin (born 1995), known online as RCLBeauty101, is an American YouTuber and singer.

Early life and education
Rachel Levin was born in Philadelphia, Pennsylvania. Her father is a doctor and her mother is a lawyer.

Levin started uploading videos to her YouTube channel when she was 15. Her first makeup tutorial video on YouTube was titled "How to Conceal Under Eye Dark Circles". She continued to regularly post videos, and at age 16, she was quoted in The Wall Street Journal in an article about online makeup tutorials.

Levin graduated from Lower Merion High School and attended Penn State Brandywine for college, but left after a year.

Career
In 2014, Levin had 350,000 subscribers to her YouTube channel. In addition to makeup tutorials, she started creating comedy videos, and her first comedy skit video was titled Back to School Expectations Vs. Reality! which by 2016 had 25.7 million views.

By 2015, Levin had a total of 516 million views on her YouTube channel.
In 2015, she was ranked as the top social media influencer under 21 by ZEFR, a marketing company that tracks social media engagement, and in August 2015, RCLBeauty101 was the YouTube channel with the most subscribers added that month. By 2016, she had over 8 million subscribers to her YouTube channel and over 60 million views for her video Disney Princess Slumber Party. Fans of her channel became known as "Levinators".

In 2017, she gained more than 222 million views on YouTube, with more than 11 million views for her Disney Princess Prom video. By 2019, she had more than 13 million YouTube subscribers, by 2020, more than 14 million, and by 2022, more than 14.4 million. Her channel is the 83rd most subscribed YouTube channel in the United States.

Levin launched her own makeup brand RCLÓ Cosmetics in 2020. Levin also started her music career in 2020 when she debuted her first single, "Myself", which she co-wrote with Brent Morgan.

Awards and nominations

References

External links

1995 births
Living people
20th-century American Jews
American YouTubers
Pennsylvania State University alumni
People from Philadelphia
Women video bloggers
American women bloggers
American bloggers
Social media influencers
DIY YouTubers
Lifestyle YouTubers
Beauty and makeup YouTubers
Lower Merion High School alumni
Fashion YouTubers
Comedy YouTubers
21st-century American women
21st-century American Jews
20th-century American women